Shooter is a 2007 American action thriller film directed by Antoine Fuqua and written by Jonathan Lemkin, based on the 1993 novel Point of Impact by Stephen Hunter. The film follows Force Recon Marine Scout Sniper veteran Bob Lee Swagger (Mark Wahlberg), who is framed for murder by a mercenary unit operating for a private military firm. The film also stars Michael Peña, Danny Glover, Kate Mara, Levon Helm, and Ned Beatty. It was produced by Lorenzo di Bonaventura through Di Bonaventura Pictures, and released by Paramount Pictures in the United States on March 23, 2007.  It grossed $95.7 million on a $61 million budget.

Plot
Force Recon sniper Gunnery Sergeant Bob Lee Swagger and his spotter Corporal Donnie Fenn are in Ethiopia to provide overwatch of an allied convoy after a mission. However, enemy militia vehicles and a helicopter gunship ambush Swagger and Fenn, and the Marines' CIA support team abandons them, resulting in Fenn's death. 

Three years later, a retired Swagger lives in isolation in the mountains of Wyoming with a pet dog. At the office of a private military company in Langley, Virginia, US Army Colonel Isaac Johnson and his associates, Payne and Dobbler, review Swagger's file. Johnson approaches Swagger and requests him to use his skills and expertise to thwart a possible attempt on the President's life that intelligence sources have uncovered. Swagger helps them determine where and how the attempt will likely be made, in Philadelphia. On the day, Swagger accompanies Johnson and his men to a room overlooking the site. However, the situation turns out to be a setup: the shot is fired according to Swagger's plan, killing the President’s guest, the Ethiopian Archbishop Desmond Mutumbo. Swagger is shot by a Philadelphia police officer on Johnson's payroll, and one of his rifles and ammunition are left at the scene to frame him for the assassination. Swagger narrowly escapes, incapacitating rookie FBI Agent Nick Memphis and stealing his bureau vehicle.

Swagger manages to stay alive long enough to track down Fenn's widow Sarah, who treats his wounds. Agent Memphis, who had been skeptical of Swagger's guilt from the beginning after doing a deep dive into Swagger's background and the circumstances surrounding the shooting. Johnson was alerted of how deep Memphis is going and has him abducted by Johnson’s men and tortured for information. Swagger kills them, frees Memphis, and asks for his help.

The duo drive to Tennessee where they meet with a firearms expert named Mr. Rate, who tells them that it is possible for a bullet to be fired from one rifle but made to look like it came from another, through a technique called paper patching, in this case, a round Swagger fired from his rifle at a can of stew a week before the assassination. Rate deduces that the Bosnian sniper Mikhaylo Sczerbiak, using the alias Michael Sandor, is the only working sniper capable of the shot. Meanwhile, Dobbler informs Johnson of Swagger's annual correspondence with Sarah, arranging for her kidnapping by Payne to be used as leverage.

After gathering supplies and weapons, Swagger and Memphis infiltrate Sczerbiak's rural Virginia home. Sczerbiak reveals to Swagger that Johnson works for U.S. Senator Charles Meachum, who leads a conglomerate exploiting economic assets in developing countries. Sczerbiak confessed that he assassinated the Archbishop in order to prevent him from speaking about the atrocities committed in Ethiopia by Johnson, such as wiping out an entire village so an oil pipeline could be built. Swagger discovers he and Fenn covered the retreat of the contractors who carried out the massacre. After revealing Sarah's abduction, Sczerbiak commits suicide before Swagger and Memphis fight their way through Johnson's mercenaries sent to eliminate them. 

Swagger arranges a meeting with Johnson and Meachum in Montana, while also tipping off the FBI. The two arrive with Payne holding Sarah at gunpoint. Memphis acts as a decoy to draw fire from Johnson's snipers, allowing Swagger to eliminate them and free Sarah, who shoots and kills Payne. Swagger confronts Meachum, replaying the recording of Sczerbiak's confession about the massacre. However, after Meachum further alludes to how big the corruption is, Swagger burns the recording, realizing it will only get him killed.

The FBI arrives and takes Swagger into custody. Later, he is allowed a private meeting with US Attorney General Russert, Johnson, and personnel from the FBI, including Memphis. Swagger's rifle, left at the assassination, is brought in. He proves to them that the rifle will not fire because he installs shorter firing pins in his guns whenever he leaves home. To further prove Swagger's innocence, Memphis displays photos of the massacre as evidence. Though all of the evidence proves Swagger's innocence for good, Russert is unable to charge Meachum and Johnson for their crimes as they are perpetrated outside of American jurisdiction.

Sympathizing with Swagger while having him released, Russert privately intimates to Swagger that extrajudicial means may be necessary to clean up the corruption. Sometime after the meeting, Meachum is in his mountain cabin, formulating with Johnson and their remaining cohorts a new plan to exterminate local villagers in Ecuador. However, Swagger kills Meachum, Johnson, and their cohorts, destroys the cabin, then meets back with Sarah, who is waiting with a vehicle.

Cast

Production

Development

The novel Point of Impact was in development first at Universal and later at Paramount for twelve years, with seven screenwriters attempting many adaptations. The author Stephen Hunter also tried to adapt the book but was put off by the experience and disconnected himself from the process.
Jonathan Lemkin read the book and some of the previous drafts and was able to avoid repeating some of the same mistakes. Lemkin updated the story away from the original post Vietnam setting, and restructured the story bringing the main event to the end of the first act, and to cut the multiple plot lines down to just the A story. His page 1 rewrite of the screenplay attracted Wahlberg and Fuqua, and on his second draft, the film got the green light to go into production. Unusual for a screenplay with such a long development process and multiple rewrites, Lemkin retained sole credit after Writers Guild of America arbitration.

Locations
Most of the film was shot on location in New Westminster, Kamloops, Mission, Ashcroft and Cache Creek in British Columbia, Canada. For example, Swagger's escape was filmed in New Westminster along the Fraser River, standing in for the Delaware River. The car chase that ends when it plunged into the river was filmed down 6th Street and off the Westminster Quay. The following scene of Swagger clinging to the side of a dredger was also filmed on the Fraser River near the Pattullo Bridge.

The assassination scenes were filmed in Independence National Historical Park in front of Independence Hall in Philadelphia. The sniper location was created from using the exteriors of the church steeple at the junction of New Street and North 4th Street and combining them with an elevated view from another building to create a fictional vista of the park. The final scene was in Mammoth Lakes, California, in the lakes basin.

The mountaintop confrontation was shot on the glaciers of Rainbow Mountain, near the resort town of Whistler, British Columbia.

Weapons and tactics
Shooter depicts a number of sniper tactics, thanks to the guidance of former US Marine scout sniper Patrick Garrity, who trained Mark Wahlberg for the film. Garrity taught Wahlberg to shoot both left- and right-handed (the actor is left-handed), as he had to switch shooting posture throughout the movie, due to Swagger's sustained injuries. He was also trained to adjust a weapon's scope, judge effects of wind on a shot, do rapid bolt manipulation, and develop special breathing skills. Fuqua appointed Garrity as the film's military-technical advisor.

In the special features of the DVD, Garrity is interviewed pointing out that the shot fired in the assassination would not have hit the archbishop straight on, as in the film. When a round is fired it will fall from  depending on the distance of the shot. To compensate, the round is fired at an arc calibrated by how far the round is going to fall, the distance of the shot, temperature, humidity, and wind. The exit wound on the archbishop's head would have been too extreme to show in movie theaters. Instead, the movie depicts a much less graphic representation of the assassination.

Throughout the film, Swagger uses an array of sniper rifles, including the USMC M40A3, the CheyTac Intervention, and the Barrett M82.

Music

The score to the film was composed by Mark Mancina, who recorded the music at the Todd-AO Scoring Stage in Studio City, Los Angeles, using a 77-piece orchestra conducted by Don Harper. A score soundtrack was released by Lakeshore Records and co-published by Shoelace Music on March 27, 2007. The song "Nasty Letter" by Otis Taylor plays over the end of the film and credits.

Reception

Box office
Shooter grossed $47 million in the US and Canada and $48.7 million in other territories, for a total gross of $95.7 million against its $61 million production budget.

The film grossed $14.5 million in its opening weekend, finishing in 3rd at the box office behind TMNT ($24.3 million) and 300 ($19.9 million).

Critical response
On Rotten Tomatoes, the film holds an approval rating of 47% based on 147 reviews and an average rating of 5.6/10. The site's critics consensus reads, "With an implausible story and numerous plot holes, Shooter fails to distinguish itself from other mindless action-thrillers." Metacritic assigns the film a weighted average score of 53 out of 100, based on 33 critics, indicating "mixed or average reviews". Audiences polled by CinemaScore gave the film an average grade of "B+" on an A+ to F scale.

Manohla Dargis of The New York Times called the film "a thoroughly reprehensible, satisfyingly violent entertainment about men and guns and things that go boom." Dargis described director Fuqua's technique as overshot and overedited, but said he has a knack for chaos and the result is "pretty enjoyable."
Kirk Honeycutt of The Hollywood Reporter gave a positive review but was critical of the weak characterization: "If the movie only lavished as much thought and care on its characters as it does on each intricate set piece, Shooter might have been a classic." Honeycutt says the problem is the screenplay by Jonathan Lemkin, and the source novel Point of Impact by film critic and author Stephen Hunter. He highlighted Peña for his performance, and praised the technical aspects of the film, particularly the stunt work, and the camera work of Peter Menzies Jr.
Tony Horkins of Empire magazine praised the movie: "The sequel-ready Swagger challenges Bourne's supremacy with an impressive shoot-'em-up, work-it-out action drama".

Some film critics saw the film as left-leaning in its politics, including arguing that the main villain (Senator Meachum) is an analogy for then Vice President Dick Cheney.

Home media

The DVD was released on June 26, 2007, reaching the top of the US sales charts. The film earned $57.6 million in DVD sales in the North America. Paramount Movies released the film on 4k Ultra HD Blu-ray on March 15, 2022.

TV series
In 2016, USA Network picked up a series of the same name based on the movie, with Wahlberg as a producer and Ryan Phillippe as Swagger.

See also

 American Sniper
 Sniper (1993 film)
 Assassinations in fiction
 Shooter, an American television series

References

External links

 
 
 
 
 
 

2007 action thriller films
2007 films
American action thriller films
American political thriller films
Di Bonaventura Pictures films
2000s English-language films
Films about the Federal Bureau of Investigation
Fictional portrayals of the Philadelphia Police Department
American films about revenge
Films about snipers
Films adapted into television shows
Films based on American novels
Films directed by Antoine Fuqua
Films produced by Lorenzo di Bonaventura
Films set in Montana
Films set in Philadelphia
Films shot in Vancouver
Paramount Pictures films
Films scored by Mark Mancina
Films set in Eritrea
Political action films
2000s American films